Prime Minister Shinawatra may refer to:

 Thaksin Shinawatra (born 1949), Thai businessman and politician, prime minister of Thailand 2001–2006
 Yingluck Shinawatra (born 1967), Thai businesswoman and politician, prime minister of Thailand 2011–2014

See also 
 Shinawatra family